This is a list of the most important tourist sites and buildings in Timișoara, Romania.

Historical places

Places of worship 
 Orthodox Cathedral
 St. George's Cathedral (The Dome)
 Serbian Orthodox Eparchy
 Serbian Orthodox Cathedral
 Millennium Church
 Iosefin Synagogue
 Fabric Synagogue
 Cetate Synagogue

Historical buildings 

 Huniade Castle
 Maria Theresia Bastion
 Brück House
 House with Lions
 Emmer House
 House with Atlantes
 House of Florymund Mercy
 Mühle House
 The Turkish House
 Dicasterial Palace
 Dauerbach Palace
 Deschan Palace
 Hilt Palace
 Vogel Palace
 Lloyd Palace
 Löffler Palace
 Merbl Palace
 Neuhausz Palace
 Széchényi Palace
 Weiss Palace
 Baroque Palace
 Water Palace
 The Roman Catholic Palace
 The old town Hall
 Military Casino
 The military hospital
 Historic abattoir
 The Piarist Complex
 Neptune Public Bathroom

Statues and historical monuments 

 Statue of the Holy Trinity 
 Statue of St. Maria 
 Statue of St. Nepomuk
 Capitoline Wolf Statue
 St. George's Monument
 Heroes Monument
 Traian Square Obelisk
 Column of Fidelity

Cultural buildings 

 National Opera
 Mihai Eminescu National Theatre
 Csiky Gergely Hungarian State Theatre
 German State Theatre
 Merlin Puppet Theatre 
 Banat Philharmonic

Museums 
 Museum of Banat
 Banat Village Museum 
 Memorial Museum of the 1989 Revolution 
 Art Museum 
 Museum of the Communist Consumer
 Serbian Bishops' Collection

Educational 

Public
 West University
 Polytechnic University
 Victor Babeș University of Medicine and Pharmacy
 Banat University of Agricultural Sciences and Veterinary Medicine

Private
 Dimitrie Cantemir University 
 Tibiscus University
 Mihai Eminescu University 
 Ioan Slavici University

Squares 

 Victory Square (Opera Square)
 Liberty Square
 Union Square
 Saint George Square
 Traian Square
 Bălcescu Square
 Saint Maria Square
 Plevnei Square
 Mocioni Square (Sinaia Square)

Sport 
 Stadionul Dan Păltinișanu
 Stadionul Electrica
 Stadionul Știința
 Stadionul CFR

Gardens, parks and forests 
 Botanical Park
 Central Park
 Cathedral Park
 Alpineț Park
 Justice Park
 Roses Park
 Children's Park
 Civil Park
 People's Park (Queen Maria Park)
 Zoological Garden
 Green Forest

Shopping Centers 
 Iulius Mall Timișoara
 Shopping City Timișoara

Notes 

 Places in Timisoara